Alberto Del Guerra from the University of Pisa, Pisa, Italy was named Fellow of the Institute of Electrical and Electronics Engineers (IEEE) in 2012 for contributions to radiation detectors and systems for medical physics and molecular imaging.

References

Fellow Members of the IEEE
Living people
Academic staff of the University of Pisa
Year of birth missing (living people)
Place of birth missing (living people)